FC Sellier & Bellot Vlašim is a football club located in Vlašim, Czech Republic. It currently plays in the Czech National Football League.

Players

Current squad
.

Notable former players

Managers

Zdeněk Hašek (?–2008)
Roman Nádvorník (2009–10)
Boris Kočí (2011)
Roman Nádvorník (2011)
Luboš Urban (2011–12)
Martin Frýdek (2012–13)
Michal Horňák (2013)
Vlastimil Petržela (2014–16)
Martin Hašek (2016–17)
Petr Havlíček (2017–18)
Erich Brabec (2018–19)
Michal Mašek (2019)
Daniel Šmejkal (2019–2021)
Martin Hyský (2021–present)

Honours
Bohemian Football League (third tier)
 Champions 2008–09

References

External links
 

 
Football clubs in the Czech Republic
Association football clubs established in 1922
Benešov District
1922 establishments in Czechoslovakia